Diospyros hirsuta is a tree in the ebony family endemic to Sri Lanka.

Trunk
Bark - finely fissured, black; Immature Bark - reddish.

References

External links
 
 http://indiabiodiversity.org/species/show/263212
 http://plants.jstor.org/taxon/diospyros.hirsuta

hirsuta
Endemic flora of Sri Lanka